Prickly Pears is a 1981  Italian comedy film directed by Steno.

Plot 
Lorenzo Millozzi is the mayor of a small town. One night, coming home, he surprises the notorious playboy Ghigo Buccilli who tries to seduce his wife: furious, he threatens the two with a gun, so as to cause a heart attack in Buccilli, who is forced to a total rest, and then to remain at the mayor's house...

Cast 
 Renato Pozzetto: Lorenzo Millozzi
 Aldo Maccione: Arrigo "Ghigo" Buccilli
 Gloria Guida: Lia Millozzi
 Diego Abatantuono: "Belve" Chief
 Gianfranco Barra: Commissioner
 Daniele Formica: Lanzarotti
 Luca Sportelli: Don Eusebio 
 Néstor Garay: The Doctor (brother of Lorenzo) 
 Licinia Lentini: Wife of Cicognelli 
 Daniele Vargas: The President

See also
 List of Italian films of 1981

References

External links

1981 films
Italian comedy films
1981 comedy films
Films directed by Stefano Vanzina
Adultery in films
1980s Italian films